El bonaerense is a 2000 Argentine, Chilean, French, and Dutch drama film. It was directed and produced by Pablo Trapero.  The screenplay was a joint effort of Nicolas Gueilburt, Ricardo Ragendorfer, Dodi Shoeuer, Pablo Trapero, and actor Daniel Valenzuela, and partly funded by INCAA. It features Jorge Román, Mimí Ardú, among others.

The movie deals with the corruption of the Bonaerense Police in the Buenos Aires Province, Argentina, and the lives of those involved in it.

Plot
Zapa is a locksmith apprentice living a simple life in Corrientes with his family. After the locksmith Polaco breaks open a safe and uses him as a scapegoat, Zapa is convicted and sentenced to imprisonment in the Buenos Aires police jail, which is pictured as notoriously corrupt. This takes him to the La Matanza barrio in Greater Buenos Aires. Here, Zapa is taken in as the protégé of his superior Gallo and begins to climb the ladder of corruption. At the same time he has an affair with instructor Mabel. His journey through the political underworld as he frames and bribes ultimately takes him to the edge of innocence, and a final confrontation with Polaco.

Cast
 Jorge Román as Zapa
 Mimí Ardú as Mabel
 Darío Levy as Gallo
 Víctor Hugo Carrizo as Molinari
 Hugo Anganuzzi as Polaco
 Graciana Chironi as Zapa's Mother
 Luis Viscat as Pellegrino
 Roberto Posse as Ismael
 Aníbal Barengo as Caneva
 Lucas Olivera as Abdala
 Gastón Polo as Lanza
 Jorge Luis Giménez as Berti

Distribution
The film was first presented at the 2002 Cannes Film Festival on May 21 in the Un Certain Regard section.  It opened in Argentina on September 19, 2002.

The picture was screened at various film festivals, including: the Karlovy Vary Film Festival, Czech Republic; the Toronto International Film Festival, Canada; the Chicago International Film Festival, United States; the Bergen International Film Festival, Norway; the Stockholm International Film, Sweden; and others.

Reception

Critical response
New York Times film critic Stephen Holden lauded the film and wrote, "There are no crusading moralists to clean up the mess in El bonaerense, Pablo Trapero's grim, dispassionate drama of police corruption, set mostly in contemporary Buenos Aires. This powerful sweat-stained swatch of Argentine neo-realism, filmed in harsh high contrast that throws its characters' faces into deep shadow, follows the initiation of Zapa (Jorge Román), a naïve police recruit, into a labyrinth of sleaze...[the film] is all the more disturbing for refusing to act as an exposé. It just throws up its hands and says that this is the way it is. And its pointed detachment lends certain scenes an almost farcical sense of the absurd."

Awards
Wins
 Chicago International Film Festival: FIPRESCI Prize, Pablo Trapero; for the uncompromising and raw depiction of the journey of a man lost in a society without values; 2002.
 Guadalajara Mexican Film Festival: Mayahuel Award, Best Film - Ibero-American Jury, Pablo Trapero; 2003.
 Lima Latin American Film Festival: Best Screenplay, Pablo Trapero; 2003.
 Lleida Latin-American Film Festival: Best Film, Pablo Trapero; 2003.
 Argentine Film Critics Association Awards: Silver Condor;  Best Editing, Nicolas Goldbart; Best New Actress, Mimí Ardú; 2003.

Nominations
 Thessaloniki Film Festival: Golden Alexander, Pablo Trapero; 2002.
 Argentine Film Critics Association Awards: Silver Condor, Best Art Direction, Sebastián Roses; Best Cinematography, Guillermo Nieto; Best Director, Pablo Trapero; Best Film; Best New Actor, Jorge Román; Best Original Screenplay, Pablo Trapero; Best Sound, Catriel Vildosola; Best Supporting Actress, Mimí Ardú; 2003.
 Cartagena Film Festival: Golden India Catalina, Best Film, Pablo Trapero; 2004.

References

External links
 
 El bonaerense at the cinenacional.com 
 El bonaerense review at Cineismo by Guillermo Ravaschino 
  

2002 films
2002 drama films
Films directed by Pablo Trapero
Films set in Argentina
Chilean independent films
Social realism in film
2000s Spanish-language films
Argentine independent films
Dutch independent films
French independent films
Argentine drama films
Chilean drama films
Dutch drama films
French drama films
2002 independent films
2000s French films
2000s Argentine films